Breakfast with Curtis is a 2012 American film written and directed by Laura Colella. The film premiered at the 2012 LA Film Festival.

References

External links
 

2012 films
American drama films
2010s English-language films
2010s American films